Randers HK was a women's handball club based in Randers, Denmark. They competed in the Bambusa Kvindeligaen and played their home matches in Arena Randers.

In November 2022, the club decided to declare itself bankrupt after failing to raise over DKK 5 million. The club was then withdrawn from the league, with immediately effect.

History 
Randers HK was founded in 1996 as a collaborative effort between several smaller clubs from the Randers Municipality to create a handball team that could represent the region at the top level.

In 2000, they reached the final of the Women's EHF Challenge Cup.

The season 2009/2010 was the greatest from the history of the club, Randers HK finishing runner-up in the domestic championship GuldBageren Ligaen and winning the Women's EHF Cup. In 2011/2012, they finally won the Danish Championship. In 2016, they lifted the Danish Cup trophy. 

In 2017, the club started 'from scratch', rebuilding the club from the foundations. The club has strengthened its organisation and now appears, on all fronts, equipped to continue the journey towards new goals and sporting success.

Results 

EHF Cup
Winners (1): 2010
EHF Challenge Cup
Runners-Up (1): 2000
Danish Championship
Winners (1): 2012
Runners-Up (2): 2010, 2011
Danish Cup
Winners (1): 2016

European record

Kits

Notable players 

 Camilla Dalby
 Gitte Andersen
 Mie Augustesen
 Melanie Bak
 Stephanie Andersen
 Simone Böhme
 Katrine Fruelund
 Cecilie Greve
 Kathrine Heindahl
 Heidi Johansen
 Mie Højlund
 Berit Kristensen
 Christina Krogshede
 Mette Melgaard
 Merete Møller
 Anna Sophie Okkels
 Ann Grete Nørgaard
 Jane Schumacher
 Sille Thomsen
 Gitte Aaen
 Frederikke Gulmark
 Lærke Christensen
 Ilda Kepić
 Cecilie Thorsteinsen
 Terese Pedersen
 Martine Moen
 Linn Gossé
 Mari Molid
 Angelica Wallén
 Johanna Westberg
 Ulrika Toft Hansen
 Sabina Jacobsen
 Sara Johansson
 Daniela Gustin
 Clara Monti Danielsson
 Macarena Aguilar
 Verónica Cuadrado
 Nina Müller
 Angie Geschke
 Stefanie Melbeck
 Susann Müller
 Jelena Erić
 Jovana Risović
 Tanja Milanović
 Ana Vojčić
 Chao Zhai
 Chana Masson
 Carmen Amariei
 Mihaela Ani-Senocico
 Stéphanie Moreau
 Siraba Dembélé
 Bernadett Bódi
 Szabina Tápai 
 Anikó Kántor 
 Natasja Burgers

Head coach history

Top scorers in the EHF Champions League 
(All-Time) – Last updated on 2 October 2021

Stadium 
Name: Arena Randers
City: Randers
Capacity: 2,500 spectators
Address: Fyensgade 1, 8900 Randers C

References 

Danish handball clubs
Handball clubs established in 1996
Randers
1996 establishments in Denmark